Spanish Nights (French:Nuit d'Espagne) is a 1931 American Pre-Code drama film directed by Henri de la Falaise and starring Jeanne Helbling, Rose Dione and Geymond Vital. It is the French-language version of Transgression, with only Adrienne D'Ambricourt appearing in both films.

Cast
 Jeanne Helbling as Elsie Maury  
 Rose Dione as Paula Vrain  
 Geymond Vital as Le marquis de Lupa  
 Jean Delmour as Robert Maury  
 Marcelle Corday as Undetermined Role  
 Adrienne D'Ambricourt as Julie

References

Bibliography
 Harry Waldman & Anthony Slide. Hollywood and the Foreign Touch: A Dictionary of Foreign Filmmakers and Their Films from America, 1910-1995. Scarecrow Press, 1996.

External links
 

1931 films
1931 drama films
1930s French-language films
American drama films
Films directed by Henri de la Falaise
Films set in Spain
Films set in Paris
American multilingual films
American black-and-white films
1931 multilingual films
1930s American films